Sisk is an Irish surname and has been found in East Cork since the 18th century.  A modern version of the medieval surname Saghas of County Kildare.

The earliest form of Sisk is found in Tenby, Wales in 1405. Sayse, from Sais, a sobriquet meaning "Saxon".

People with the surname include:
 Bernice F. Sisk, (1910–95) American Congressman
 Doug Sisk (born 1957) Major League baseball player
 Howard Sisk (c.1930–2001) aka "Curly Howard", American radio disc jockey
 Jerry Sisk, Jr.  (1953–2013) American gemologist and co-founder of Jewelry Television
 John Sisk, (1837–1921) Irish builder, founder of the Sisk Group
 John Sisk, Jr. (born 1941) American football player
 Johnny Sisk (born 1906) American football player
 Laura Wright née Laura Sisk (born 1970) American actress
 Mark Sisk, (born 1942)  Episcopal Bishop of New York
 Mildred Gillars née Mildred Sisk (1900–88), nicknamed "Axis Sally", American broadcaster in Nazi Germany 
 Tommie Sisk (born 1942) Major League baseball player

References